Ciaran Long (born 9 February 1991) is an English ice hockey player for Belfast Giants and the British national team.

He represented Great Britain at the 2021 IIHF World Championship.

References

External links

1991 births
Living people
Basingstoke Bison players
Belfast Giants players
British expatriate ice hockey people
English expatriate sportspeople in New Zealand
English ice hockey left wingers
Manchester Phoenix players
Manchester Storm (2015–) players
Slough Jets players
Sportspeople from Birmingham, West Midlands
Swindon Wildcats players
Trafford Metros players